Františka Zeminová (15 August 1882 – 26 September 1962) was a Czechoslovakian women's rights activist and politician. In 1920 she was elected to the Chamber of Deputies, becoming one of the first group of female parliamentarians in the country. She remained a member of parliament until 1948, after which she was jailed by the communist authorities.

Biography
Zeminová was born in Dolní Chvatliny, then in Austria-Hungary, in 1882, the youngest of twelve children of a farming couple. She graduated from business school and from the age of 20 until 1918 worked as an accountant and saleswoman in the Prague publishing house I. L. Kober. She had been active in the Czech National Social Party since 1897, but was unable to join until 1912. In 1905, together with Františka Plamínková, she was a co-founder of the Committee on Women's Suffrage and several other women's associations. Her participation in demonstrations brought her to the attention of the Austrian police, and she spent a short time in jail for 'anti-state activities'. She was also involved in the trade union movement and had articles published in the Ženské snahy monthly magazine and České slovo daily newspaper.

Following the formation of Czechoslovakia, she was a candidate in the 1920 parliamentary elections, and was elected to the Chamber of Deputies. She was re-elected in 1925, 1929 and 1935 serving until 1939. Following the occupation of parts of Czechoslovakia by Germany and Hungary in 1939, she became a member of the Party of National Unity. After World War II she served in the Interim National Assembly from 1945 to 1946 and was then elected to the Constituent National Assembly, serving until the 1948 elections.

Following the 1948 coup, she was arrested in 1949 and sentenced to 20 years in jail. She spent eleven years in prisons in Prague, Jihlava and Plzeň working as a seamstress, before being pardoned by President Antonín Novotný as part of a large amnesty in 1960. During her time in prison she had organised hunger strikes, and suffered two heart attacks. After being released, she remained under the supervision of the StB until her death in Velichovky in 1962. She was posthumously awarded the Order of Tomáš Garrigue Masaryk in 1992.

References

External links
Fráňa Zeminová Parliament of the Czech Republic

1882 births
Czech suffragists
Czechoslovak women in politics
Members of the Chamber of Deputies of Czechoslovakia (1920–1925)
Members of the Chamber of Deputies of Czechoslovakia (1925–1929)
Members of the Chamber of Deputies of Czechoslovakia (1929–1935)
Members of the Chamber of Deputies of Czechoslovakia (1935–1939)
Czech National Social Party politicians
1962 deaths
Recipients of the Order of Tomáš Garrigue Masaryk